Megastomia conoidea is a species of sea snail, a marine gastropod mollusk in the family Pyramidellidae, the pyrams and their allies.

Description
The shell size varies between 2.5 mm and 7 mm. The white shell is solid, polished and with microscopic growth lines. The periphery is more or less distinctly keeled or angulated, with an impressed spiral line. There are eight, nearly flat whorls. The umbilicus is small and deep. The columellar tooth is strong and prominent. The interior of the outer lip is ridged, terminating in small tubercles within the mouth.

(Description of Odostomia sicula) The white shell is solid and polished. Its length measures 6.25 mm. The eight whorls of the teleoconch are nearly flat. They are marked with microscopic growth lines. The periphery of the shell is more or less distinctly keeled or angulated. The shell shows an impressed spiral line. The small umbilicus goes deep. The columellar tooth is strong and prominent. The interior of the lip is ridged, terminating in small tubercles within the aperture.

G.W. Tryon (1889) considered it a synonym of Odostomia conoidea Brocchi.

Distribution
This species occurs in the following locations:
 Angola
 Canary Islands
 Cape Verde Archipelago
 the Atlantic Ocean (Norway to West Africa, Senegal, Angola)
 São Tomé and Príncipe Archipelagos
 United Kingdom Exclusive Economic Zone
 Mediterranean Sea

References

 Philippi, Zeitsch. fur Malac., p. 88, 1852.
  Requien E. (1848). Catalogue des Coquilles de l'Île de Corse. Seguin, Avignon v-xii, 13-109
 Gofas, S.; Le Renard, J.; Bouchet, P. (2001). Mollusca, in: Costello, M.J. et al. (Ed.) (2001). European register of marine species: a check-list of the marine species in Europe and a bibliography of guides to their identification. Collection Patrimoines Naturels, 50: pp. 180–213 
 de Kluijver, M.J.; Ingalsuo, S.S.; de Bruyne, R.H. (2000). Macrobenthos of the North Sea [CD-ROM]: 1. Keys to Mollusca and Brachiopoda. World Biodiversity Database CD-ROM Series. Expert Center for Taxonomic Identification (ETI): Amsterdam, The Netherlands. . 1 cd-rom
 Rolán E., 2005. Malacological Fauna From The Cape Verde Archipelago. Part 1, Polyplacophora and Gastropoda

External links
 To Encyclopedia of Life
 To ITIS
 To GenBank
 To World Register of Marine Species
 

Pyramidellidae
Gastropods described in 1884
Molluscs of the Atlantic Ocean
Molluscs of the Mediterranean Sea